Blissfucker is the fourth studio album by the American grindcore/crust punk band Trap Them. It was released on June 10, 2014. It is the first album to feature their new bassist, Galen Baudhuin (Infera Bruo), and drummer Brad Fickeisen (No Salvation, ex-The Red Chord). Like their 2011 release, Darker Handcraft, it will also be released on Prosthetic Records. At 5:30 of the track "Let Fall Each and Every Sedition Symptom," is a hidden track, a re-recording of Insomniawesome, from their first album, Sleepwell Deconstructor.

Track listing

Personnel
Trap Them
 Brian Izzi – guitar
 Galen Baudhuin – bass
 Brad Fickeisen – drums
 Ryan McKenney – vocals

References

Trap Them albums
2014 albums
Prosthetic Records albums
Albums produced by Kurt Ballou